Sighthill Stadium was a proposed stadium to be located in the Sighthill district of Edinburgh, Scotland.  It would have been a multi-use stadium hosting a number of sports, principally athletics and rugby.  Edinburgh Rugby were considered key potential tenants.  In the published plans the new stadium was due to replace Meadowbank Stadium, which would have been sold off for housing.  The scheme ran into difficulties due to opposition to the sale of Meadowbank.

References

Unbuilt stadiums in the United Kingdom
Proposed buildings and structures in Scotland
Sports venues in Edinburgh